The Beeches Light Railway is a private narrow gauge railway in Steeple Aston, Oxfordshire, England, in the garden of the late Adrian Shooter, the former director of Chiltern Railways.

History 

In 2019, Shooter announced that the Beeches Light Railway would close at the end of the year. It was planned to move the railway to a new, larger location, re-opening in Spring 2020.   the railway remained in-situ.

Track 

It resembles a figure of eight, with a loop around the back garden and another around the front, where it crosses the main drive. An Indian style railway station and sheds are behind the house. The theme of an Indian railway is present throughout, including the name of the station ("Ringkingpong Road Station"), fare evasion signs citing Indian rupees, and some interior decorations as well. Although the railway is private, and not subject to rail regulations, it is run professionally by Shooter and some volunteers with railway rulebooks and regulations, and the steam engine has to be certified each year.

Steam locomotive 

The railway's primary motive power, a Class 'B' steam locomotive 778, was built by Sharp Stewart in 1888, works number 3518. 778 was built for to India's Darjeeling Himalayan Railway. where it ran until either 1960 or 1962, when it was sold to Elliot Donnelley, a railway enthusiast in the US, who was the major shareholder in RR Donnelley Co, a large printer and publisher in Chicago. After Donnelley died in 1975 the locomotive passed to the Hesston Steam Museum, where it stayed until it was bought by Adrian Shooter in 2002 and restored to working order.

Carriages 
Two modern replicas of the carriages used on the Darjeeling Himalayan Railway are occasionally used to transport invited guests.  Carriages to accompany the locomotive were commissioned from Boston Lodge works.

Draisine 

Shooter owned also a replica Ford Model-T motorcar that he ran on the tracks. It is based on a modified car used by the USA railway to inspect tracks on the Sandy River and Rangeley Lakes Railroad. The replica was commissioned from the Statfold Barn Railway. It includes a jacking system that will lift the wheels free of the rails and allow it to be rotated on its axis in order to go the other way round.

Additional rolling stock 

Stored in the railway shed is some rolling stock from the London Mail Rail, an underground goods railway line, which was used to transport letters and parcels between sorting depots before it was mothballed.

References 

Rail transport in Oxfordshire
2 ft gauge railways in England